Mesiphiastus pubiventris is a species of beetle in the family Cerambycidae. It was described by Francis Polkinghorne Pascoe in 1862, originally under the genus Symphyletes. It is known from Australia. It feeds on Melaleuca uncinata.

References

Pteropliini
Beetles described in 1862